Anthony Adams (born January 13, 1988) is an American mixed martial artist who competes in the Middleweight division of Bellator MMA.

Professional career

Early career (2016–2018) 
In Adams early career he competed in SCL for seven fights. In SCL he fought; Flavio Rodrigo Magon, Tilek Mashrapov, Steve Hanna, Ian Stonehouse, Lorawnt-T Nelson, Artak Petrosyan and Eric Coxbill. He won all seven bouts via decision, five unanimous and two split decisions. After compiling in a record of 7-0 from SCL he was signed a offer to compete on Dana White's Contender Series.

2018–present 
Adams had his first Contender series bout at Dana White's Contender Series 13, in which he fought Chibwikem Onyenegecha and lost via Split Decision. Adam rebounded in his LFA debut at LFA 57, defeating Josh Cavan winning via TKO in the 4 minutes into the 1st round.

Adams was then given a second chance at Dana White's Contender Series in a bout against Impa Kasanganay. Adam lost the bout via unanimous decision.

Adams was then signed to Bellator and was scheduled to fight Khalid Murtazaliev, it was announced that the bout would take place at Bellator 266 - Romero vs. Davis Adam's won the bout via Unanimous Decision.

Adams, as a replacement for Khalid Murtazaliev, was scheduled to face Lorenz Larkin on May 6, 2022 at Bellator 280. Adams in turn pulled out as well and was replaced by UFC vet Kyle Stewart.

Adams was scheduled to face Austin Vanderford at Bellator 284 - Gracie vs Yamauchi on August 12, 2022, but Adams pulled out of the bout 2 weeks before the event.

Adams faced Dalton Rosta at Bellator 289: Stots vs. Sabatello on December 9, 2022. Adams lost the fight via Unanimous Decision.

Adams is scheduled to face Sharaf Davlatmurodov on April 21, 2023 at Bellator 294.

Mixed martial arts record

|-
|Loss
|align=center|9–3
|Dalton Rosta
|Decision (unanimous)
|Bellator 289
|
|align=center|3
|align=center|5:00
|Uncasville, Connecticut, United States
|
|-
|Win
|align=center|9–2
|Khalid Murtazaliev
|Decision (unanimous)
|Bellator 266
|
|align=center|3
|align=center|5:00
|San Jose, California, United States
|
|-
|Loss
|align=center|8–2
|Impa Kasanganay
|Decision (unanimous)
|Dana White's Contender Series 28
|
|align=center|3
|align=center|5:00
|Las Vegas, Nevada, United States
|
|-
|Win
|align=center|8–1
|Josh Cavan
|TKO (punches)
| LFA 57
| 
|align=center|1
|align=center|4:56
| Broomfield, Colorado, United States
|
|-
|Loss
|align=center|7–1
|Chibwikem Onyenegecha
|Decision (split)
|Dana White's Contender Series 13
|
|align=center|3
|align=center|5:00
|Las Vegas, Nevada, United States
|
|-
|Win
|align=center|7–0
|Flavio Rodrigo Magon
|Decision (unanimous)
|SCL: Army vs Marines 9
|
|align=center|3
|align=center|5:00
|Denver, Colorado, United States
|
|-
| Win
| align=center|6–0
| Tilek Mashrapov
| Decision (split)
| SCL 66
| 
| align=center|1
| align=center|1:17
| Loveland, Colorado, United States
|
|-
| Win
| align=center|5–0
|Steve Hanna
|Decision (unanimous)
|SCL 62
|
|align=center| 3
|align=center| 5:00
|Denver, Colorado, United States
|
|-
|Win
|align=center|4–0
|Ian Stonehouse
|Decision (unanimous)
|SCL 60
|
|align=center|3
|align=center|5:00
|Denver, Colorado, United States
|
|-
|Win
|align=center|3–0
|Lorawnt-T Nelson
|Decision (unanimous)
|SCL: Battle of the Badges 
|
|align=center|3
|align=center|5:00
|Denver, Colorado, United States 
|
|-
|Win
|align=center|2–0
|Artak Petrosyan
|Decision (unanimous)
|SCL 55
|
|align=center|3
|align=center|5:00
|Loveland, Colorado, United States
|
|-
|Win
|align=center|1–0
|Eric Coxbill
|Decision (split)
|SCL 48
|
|align=center|3
|align=center|5:00
|Denver, Colorado, United States
|
|-

See also 

 List of current Bellator fighters
 List of male mixed martial artists

References

External links 
  
 

1988 births
Living people
American male mixed martial artists
Middleweight mixed martial artists
Bellator male fighters